An axoneme, also called an axial filament is the microtubule-based cytoskeletal structure that forms the core of a cilium or flagellum. Cilia and flagella are found on many cells, organisms, and microorganisms, to provide motility. The axoneme serves as the "skeleton" of these organelles, both giving support to the structure and, in some cases, the ability to bend. Though distinctions of function and length may be made between cilia and flagella, the internal structure of the axoneme is common to both.

Structure 
Inside a cilium and a flagellum is a microtubule-based cytoskeleton called the axoneme.  The axoneme of a primary cilium typically has a ring of nine outer microtubule doublets (called a 9+0 axoneme),  and the axoneme of a motile cilium has two central microtubules in addition to the nine outer doublets (called a 9+2 axoneme).  The axonemal cytoskeleton acts as a scaffolding for various protein complexes and provides binding sites for molecular motor proteins such as kinesin-2, that help carry proteins up and down the microtubules.

Primary cilia
The axoneme structure in non-motile primary cilia is of an outer nine microtubule doublets with no central microtubule singlets, and no dynein arms on the outer doublets. This arrangement is known as the 9+0 axoneme. Primary cilia appear to serve sensory functions.

Motile cilia
The building-block of the axoneme is the microtubule; each axoneme is composed of several microtubules aligned in a characteristic pattern known as the 9+2 axoneme as shown in the image at right. Nine sets of doublet microtubules (a specialized structure consisting of two linked microtubules) form a ring around a central pair of single microtubules.

Besides the microtubules, the axoneme contains many proteins and protein complexes necessary for its function. The dynein arms, for example, are motor complexes that produce the force needed for bending. Each dynein arm is anchored to a doublet microtubule; by "walking" along an adjacent microtubule, the dynein motors can cause the microtubules to slide against each other. When this is carried out in a synchronized fashion, with the microtubules on one side of the axoneme being pulled 'down' and those on the other side pulled 'up,' the axoneme as a whole can bend back and forth. This process is responsible for ciliary/flagellar beating, as in the well-known example of the human sperm.

The radial spoke is another protein complex of the axoneme. Thought to be important in regulating the motion of the axoneme, this "T"-shape complex projects from each set of outer doublets toward the central microtubules. The inter-doublet connections between adjacent microtubule pairs are termed nexin linkages.

History of discovery 
The first investigation of sperm flagellar morphology was begun in 1888, by German cytologist Ballowitz, who observed using light microscopy and mordant stains that a rooster sperm flagellum could be splayed into as many as 11, longitudinal fibrils. About 60 years later, Grigg and Hodge in 1949  and a year later Manton and Clarke observed these 11 fibers in splayed flagella by electron microscopy (EM); these investigators proposed that two thinner fibers were surrounded by nine thicker outer fibers. In 1952, using advancements in fixation, embedding, and ultramicrotomy, Fawcett and Porter proved by EM thin sections that the core of epithelial cilia within the ciliary membrane consisted of nine doublet microtubules surrounding two central, singlet microtubules (i.e., the “central pair microtubule apparatus”), and hence the term, the “9 + 2” axoneme. Because of the high degree of evolutionary conservation between cilia and flagella from most species, our understanding of sperm flagella has been aided by studies of both organelles and from species ranging from protists to mammals. Cilia are typically short (5–10 μm) and beat in an oar-like fashion with an effective stroke followed by a recovery stroke. Flagella beat with a snake-like motion and are typically longer (generally 50–150 μm, but ranging from 12 μm to several mm in some species), with flagellar length in the protist Chlamydomonas being regulated by several genes encoding kinases. It was recognized first by Manton and Clarke that the 9 + 2 axoneme was possibly ubiquitous among species, and indeed, the nine doublet microtubules are evolutionary conserved structures that evolved in early eukaryotes nearly a billion years ago; however, there is wide variation among species with regard to the detailed structure of sperm flagella and their accessory structures. Axonemal doublet microtubules assemble from the ends of nine centriolar/basal body triplet microtubules, whose ninefold symmetry and clockwise pinwheel pattern (looking from inside the cell to the flagellar tip) is organized by the conserved protein of the SAS6 gene, and which is introduced into some eggs to establish the first mitotic spindle. The nine doublet microtubules are then connected around the axoneme by nexin links. Currently, the molecular structure of the axoneme is known to an extraordinary resolution of <4 nm  through the use of cryo-electron tomography, as initially pioneered by Nicastro. Sperm flagellar (and ciliary) motility has been effectively analyzed in simple systems (e.g., protist flagella and sea urchin sperm), whose flagella contain several hundred polypeptides by proteomic analysis.

Clinical significance
Mutations or defects in primary cilia have been found to play a role in human diseases. These ciliopathies include polycystic kidney disease (PKD), retinitis pigmentosa, Bardet–Biedl syndrome, and other developmental defects.

References

Further reading 

 
 
 
 
 
 

Organelles